James Montross Burt (July 18, 1917 — February 15, 2006) was a United States Army armor officer who received the Medal of Honor for his valor in the Battle of Aachen during World War II.

Burt was born in New England and graduated from Norwich University in 1939 where he was a member of Theta Chi Fraternity. The Norwich Corps of Cadets is known historically as a source of cavalry officers and Burt was commissioned as an armor officer - then the new mechanized form of cavalry. He entered active service in 1941 and was assigned to the 66th Armor Regiment, 2nd Armored Division at Fort Benning, Georgia. He served in North Africa, Sicily, and Northern Europe. Promoted to captain, Burt commanded Company B, 66th Armor in near continuous combat from the day the unit landed at the Normandy beachhead in June 1944 through the end of the war.

Medal of Honor citation
Captain Burt's Medal of Honor citation is unique in that he was awarded the medal not for a single act of valor, but instead for his actions during a 10-day period in October 1944 as the 2nd Armored Division fought to capture Aachen, Germany.

The official citation reads:

Rank and organization: Captain, U.S. Army, Company B, 66th Armored Regiment, 2d Armored Division. 
Place and date: Near Wurselen, Germany, October 13, 1944. 
Entered service at: Lee, Mass. Birth: Hinsdale, Mass. 
G.O. No.: 95, October 30, 1945.

Citation:

Capt. James M. Burt was in command of Company B, 66th Armored Regiment on the western outskirts of Wurselen, Germany, on 13 October 1944, when his organization participated in a coordinated infantry-tank attack destined to isolate the large German garrison which was tenaciously defending the city of Aachen. In the first day's action, when infantrymen ran into murderous small-arms and mortar fire, Capt. Burt dismounted from his tank about 200 yards to the rear and moved forward on foot beyond the infantry positions, where, as the enemy concentrated a tremendous volume of fire upon him, he calmly motioned his tanks into good firing positions. As our attack gained momentum, he climbed aboard his tank and directed the action from the rear deck, exposed to hostile volleys which finally wounded him painfully in the face and neck. He maintained his dangerous post despite pointblank self-propelled gunfire until friendly artillery knocked out these enemy weapons, and then proceeded to the advanced infantry scouts' positions to deploy his tanks for the defense of the gains which had been made. The next day, when the enemy counterattacked, he left cover and went 75 yards through heavy fire to assist the infantry battalion commander who was seriously wounded. For the next 8 days, through rainy, miserable weather and under constant, heavy shelling, Capt. Burt held the combined forces together, dominating and controlling the critical situation through the sheer force of his heroic example. To direct artillery fire, on 15 October, he took his tank 300 yards into the enemy lines, where he dismounted and remained for 1 hour giving accurate data to friendly gunners. Twice more that day he went into enemy territory under deadly fire on reconnaissance. In succeeding days he never faltered in his determination to defeat the strong German forces opposing him. Twice the tank in which he was riding was knocked out by enemy action, and each time he climbed aboard another vehicle and continued the fight. He took great risks to rescue wounded comrades and inflicted prodigious destruction on enemy personnel and materiel even though suffering from the wounds he received in the battle's opening phase. Capt. Burt's intrepidity and disregard of personal safety were so complete that his own men and the infantry who attached themselves to him were inspired to overcome the wretched and extremely hazardous conditions which accompanied one of the most bitter local actions of the war. The victory achieved closed the Aachen gap.

Post War Life
Burt was a firm believer in the concept of the citizen-soldier and accordingly, left military service after the war. However he remained a valuable member of the 2nd Armored Division family. He visited the division on many occasions at Ft. Hood, TX and also made a trip to meet soldiers stationed with the 2nd Armored Division (Forward) in West Germany.

The Third Battalion of the 66th Armored Regiment was nicknamed "Burt's Knights" and eventually James Burt was made the Honorary Colonel of the 66th Armored Regiment.

Burt lived much of his post-war life in New Hampshire and Pennsylvania with his wife Edythe Burt. After a career in the paper industry, he attended Keene State College and received a Master's Degree in Education in 1969. Burt then became a mathematics and business instructor at Franklin Pierce College.

James M. Burt died on February 15, 2006, at the age of 88 in Wyomissing, Pennsylvania. He is buried in the Hillside Cemetery in Hancock, New Hampshire.

See also

List of Medal of Honor recipients
List of Medal of Honor recipients for World War II

References

External links

1917 births
2006 deaths
Norwich University alumni
United States Army officers
United States Army personnel of World War II
United States Army Medal of Honor recipients
World War II recipients of the Medal of Honor
Keene State College alumni
Franklin Pierce University faculty